Unión may refer to:

Places
 Unión, Paraguay
 Unión Municipality, Falcón, Venezuela
 Unión, Montevideo, Uruguay
 Unión Cantinil, Huehuetenango, Guatemala
 Unión, San Luis, Argentina
 Unión Department, Córdoba Province, Argentina
 Unión Hidalgo, Oaxaca, Mexico
 Unión Panamericana, Chocó, Colombia

Sports clubs
 Unión de Curtidores, an association football club in Léon, Mexico
 Unión de Mar del Plata, an association football club in Mar del Plata, Argentina
 Unión de Santa Fe, an association football club in Santa Fe, Argentina
 Unión de Sunchales, an association football club in Sunchales, Argentina
 Unión Deportiva Salamanca, a former association football club in Salamanca, Spain
 Unión Española, an association football club in Independencia, Chile

See also 
 La Unión (disambiguation)
 Union (disambiguation)